Kenneth Bond (born 16 October 1941) is a South African cricketer. He played in 26 first-class and 3 List A matches from 1965/66 to 1972/73.

References

External links
 

1941 births
Living people
South African cricketers
Eastern Province cricketers
Gauteng cricketers
Cricketers from Johannesburg